Sladenia is a genus of deep sea goosefishes found in the Caribbean Sea and western Pacific Ocean.

The genus was named for Percy Sladen (1849–1900), a British echinoderm biologist. The holotype of S. gardineri was collected during an expedition funded by his memorial trust.

Species
There are currently three recognized species in this genus:
 Sladenia gardineri Regan, 1908
 Sladenia remiger H. M. Smith & Radcliffe, 1912 (Celebes monkfish)
 Sladenia shaefersi J. H. Caruso & Bullis, 1976
 Sladenia zhui Y. Ni, H. L. Wu & S. Li, 2012

References

Lophiidae
Marine fish genera
Ray-finned fish genera
Taxa named by Charles Tate Regan